Jim Wynorski (born August 14, 1950) is an American screenwriter, director, and producer.

Wynorski has been making B-movies and exploitation movies since the early 1980s, and has directed over 150 feature films. His earliest films were released to movie theaters, but his later works have predominantly been released to cable or the straight-to-video market. He often works under pseudonyms such as "Jay Andrews," "Arch Stanton," "H.R. Blueberry," "Tom Popatopolis," and "Noble Henry." His movies often spoof horror films: Cleavagefield, for example, parodies Cloverfield, The Bare Wench Project parodies The Blair Witch Project, and Para-Knockers Activity parodies Paranormal Activity. A character in the film The Final Destination is named after him.

In 2009, the documentary Popatopolis, directed by Clay Westervelt and named for one of Wynorski 's pseudonyms, chronicled Wynorski during the making of his soft-core horror film, The Witches of Breastwick. The film serves as a partial biography, with clips from many of his previous films and includes interviews with Wynorski, his contemporaries, cast, and crew.

In 2016, he directed Nessie & Me, the character Jack O’Grady directly references Wynorski earlier films Dinocroc vs. Supergator and Piranhaconda when he encounters Nessie at the start of the film, hinting that Nessie & Me is canon to those film series, as well as Monster Cruise, with many characters from it appearing in Nessie & Me as well.

Career
Wynorski grew up in Long Island. He flunked out of film school and went to work at the fiction department of DoubleDay Publishing from 1972 to 1977. He wanted to work in movies, so quit his job and moved to Los Angeles. He got a job as location manager on the TV show Breaking Away, but was fired during production. Flying back to Los Angeles, he met a fellow passenger who knew Roger Corman and arranged an introduction. Wynorski went to work for Corman. He did publicity and began writing screenplays.

Wynorski 's first produced screenplay was Forbidden World (1982). He also wrote Sorceress for $1,000 and wrote and produced Screwballs (1983), a Porky's style comedy.

Directorial debut and Roger Corman
Wynorski made his directing debut with The Lost Empire.

His second film, Chopping Mall (1986), was made for Julie Corman, which Wynorski also produced and co-wrote. Julie's husband Corman liked it, and hired Wynorski to make Deathstalker 2 in Argentina, then Big Bad Mama II (1987) with Angie Dickinson, and a remake of Not of this Earth (1988) with Traci Lords. He was creative consultant on Purple People Eater (1988).

Wynorski was given a $7 million budget to make The Return of Swamp Thing (1989) with Louis Jourdan. He then made Transylvania Twist and The Haunting of Morella back to back for Roger Corman.

He also made Sorority House Massacre II (1990) for Julie Corman, on sets left over from existing films. Roger Corman was impressed and got Wynorski to remake it as Sorority House Massacre III: Hard to Die. Corman "taught me all the lessons on how to make a film and how to make it look expensive when you don't have a lot of money," Wynorski says.

He worked on the scripts for Beastmaster 2: Through the Portal of Time (1991), House IV (1992) and Final Embrace (1992) but did not direct them.

He directed 976-Evil II (1992), which was produced by Paul Hertzberg, with whom Wynorski would frequently collaborate.

Fred Olen Ray
With his friend Fred Olen Ray he directed, wrote and produced Scream Queen Hot Tub Party (1991), shot in one day. The two friends later collaborated on Dinosaur Island (1994) and co-executive produced Dark Universe (1993) and Biohazard: The Alien Force (1994) together. Ray produced Sorceress (1995) which Wynorski directed, and Wynorski helped produce Bikini Drive-In (1995), Fugitive Rage (1996), Friend of the Family II (1996) and Hybrid (1997) which Ray directed.

Family films
Wynorski made Munchie (1992), marking the film debut of Jennifer Love Hewitt; and its sequel, Munchie Strikes Back (1993). Hewitt was not part of the cast in the sequel, but he later directed Little Miss Millions (1993), which starred her. He also executive produced The Skateboard Kid 2.

Erotic thrillers
In the early 1990s he specialised in erotic thrillers, starting with Sins of Desire (1993). "I was good and I was fast,” Wynorski said. “They knew the product would be solid... They were easy to make. It didn’t require any action. You could get them done well in 12 days. The trick was making them for low money. There was plenty of competition, so you had to be good and you had to get those big stars naked. Shannon Tweed, Andrew Stevens, Shannon Whirry, Tanya Roberts all started working double time.”

Wynorski 's other erotic thrillers included Point of Seduction: Body Chemistry III (1994), Victim of Desire (1995), Body Chemistry IV: Full Exposure (1995) and Virtual Desire (1995). He later directed The Escort III (1999).

In 1998 Wynorski appeared in a documentary Some Nudity Required where he said he got into film "for the money and the chicks" and said "breasts are the cheapest special effect in the business".

Roger Corman Presents
Wynorski made two films for Corman's Showtime series, Roger Corman Presents: a remake of The Wasp Woman (1995) and Vampirella (1996). Vampirella was an unhappy experience for him - in 2013 he said that film and Victim of Desire were the only films he regretted making in his career.

Sunset Films 
Wynorski established his own production company, Sunset Films, which he ran with Andrew Stevens. It was a division of Cinetel Films. Sunset's films included Midnight Tease and its sequel; Vice Girls (1997); Sorceress II: The Temptress (1997).

He directed some of Sunset's films including Hard Bounty (1995), Demolition High (1996), Against the Law (1997), Storm Trooper (1998), Desert Thunder (1999).

He did not direct the sequel to Demolition High, Demolition University (1997), but produced and co-wrote it.

Action movies
These were action movies, as were The Pandora Project (1998), Stealth Fighter (1999), Final Voyage (1999), Militia (2000), Rangers (2000), Extreme Limits (2000) and Ablaze (2001).

He produced some films he did not direct such as Fugitive Mind (1999); Sonic Impact (2000); Active Stealth (2000), Submerged (2000), Kept (2001), Air Rage (2001), Critical Mass (2001), Venomous (2001), all  directed by Ray; Storm Catcher (2000); Jill Rips (2000) with Dolph Lundgren; Intrepid (2000), with James Coburn.

He often worked with producer and actor Andrew Stevens, who called in Wynorski to shoot additional scenes for Agent Red (2000).

Thy Neighbor's Wife (2001) was a thriller. Gale Force (2002), Lost Treasure (2003, with Stephen Baldwin) and Treasure Hunt (2003) were action films. Bad Bizness (2003) was Wynorski 's first film with a predominantly black cast.

Later action films he helped produce included Blue Demon (2004) and Sub Zero.

The Bare Wench Project and parody films
In 2000 Wynorski made The Bare Wench Project, a sex parody of The Blair Witch Project. It was popular and led to several sequels. Wynorski made several other erotic parody movies, including Busty Cops (2004) and its several sequels, The Witches of Breastwick (2005) and its sequel, Alabama Jones and the Busty Crusade (2005), The Da Vinci Coed (2007), The Breastford Wives (2007), House on Hooter Hill (2007), The Devil Wears Nada (2009), Cleavagefield (2009), Para-Knockers Activity (2009), and The Hills Have Thighs (2010).

Creature films
In 2001 Wynorski returned to Roger Corman with Raptor (2001). He later made a series of "creature" films. For Corman he did some uncredited work on Wolfhound (2002). He made Project Viper (2002) for the Sci Fi Channel.

He later made Curse of the Komodo (2004) and its sequel, Komodo vs. Cobra (2005), Gargoyle: Wings of Darkness (2004), Cry of the Winged Serpent (2007), Dinocroc vs. Supergator (2010), Camel Spiders (2010), and CobraGator (2016).

Horror films
He returned to slasher movies with Cheerleader Massacre (2003). The Thing Below (2003) was horror.

Lust Connection (2005) was a return to erotic thrillers.

Return to family films
In recent years, Wynorski has returned to the family film genre, making Nessie & Me (2016), which is in a shared universe with DinoCroc, Supergator, Dinocroc vs. Supergator, and Piranhaconda, due to the lead character referencing said films' title monsters, and Monster Cruise, from which many characters returned for Nessie & Me. He also directed A Doggone Christmas (2016), which spawned a sequel A Doggone Hollywood (2017).

Filmography 

Forbidden World (1982) - writer
Sorceress (1982) - writer
Screwballs (1983) - writer
The Lost Empire (1984) - director, writer, producer
Loose Screws (1985) a.k.a. Screwballs II - writer
Chopping Mall (1986) - director, writer
Deathstalker II (1987) - director, writer
Big Bad Mama II (1987) - director, writer
Not of This Earth (1988) - director, writer, producer
The Return of Swamp Thing (1989) - director
Think Big (1989) - story
Transylvania Twist (1989) - director, writer
The Haunting of Morella (1990) - director, writer (uncredited)
Sorority House Massacre II  (1990) - director (as "Arch Stanton")
Hard to Die (1990) - director (as "Arch Stanton"), producer
Beastmaster 2: Through the Portal of Time (1991) - writer
976-Evil 2: The Astral Factor  (1991) - director
Scream Queen Hot Tub Party (1991) - director, writer, producer (as "Arch Stanton")
Munchie (1992) - director, writer
Final Embrace (1992) - writer
House IV (1992) - story
Sins of Desire (1993) - director, story
Little Miss Millions (1993) a.k.a. Home for Christmas - director, writer
Dark Universe (1993) - co executive producer
Biohazard: The Alien Force (1994) - executive producer
Munchie Strikes Back (1994) - director, writer
Dinosaur Island (1994) - director, producer
Point of Seduction: Body Chemistry III (1994) - director
Ghoulies IV (1994) - director
The Skateboard Kid 2 (1995) - executive producer
Sorceress (1995) - director
Victim of Desire (1995) - director
Midnight Tease II (1995) - executive producer
Bikini Drive-In (1995) - executive producer
Body Chemistry IV: Full Exposure (1995) - director
The Wasp Woman (1995) - director
Hard Bounty (1995) - director, producer
Virtual Desire (1995) - director, producer
Demolition High (1996) - director
Friend of the Family II (1996) - producer
The Assault (1996) - director, producer
Fugitive Rage (1996) - writer
Vampirella (1996) - director, producer
Hybrid (1997) - producer
Vice Girls (1997) - producer
Sorceress II: The Temptress (1997) - executive producer
Demolition University (1997) - producer
Against the Law (1997) - director
The Pandora Project (1998) - director, writer
Storm Trooper (1998) - director
Desert Thunder (1999) - director, producer
Final Voyage (1999) - director (as Jay Andrews), producer, writer (as Noble Henry)
The Escort III (1999) - director (as Tom Popatopolous)
Sonic Impact (1999) - producer
Storm Catcher (1999) - producer
Active Stealth (1999) - producer
Fugitive Mind (1999) - executive producer
Agent Red (2000) - director (uncredited reshoots), producer
Rangers (2000) - director, producer
The Bare Wench Project (2000) - director, writer, producer
 (2000) a.k.a. Extreme Limits - director
Jill Rips (2000) - producer
Intrepid (2000) - producer
Submerged (2000) - producer
Ablaze (2001) - director
Kept (2001) - producer
Air Rage (2001) - producer
Thy Neighbor's Wife (2001) a.k.a. Poison - director, story
The Bare Wench Project 2: Scared Topless (2001) - director, writer, producer
Raptor (2001) - director, writer
Critical Mass (2001) - producer
Venomous (2001) - producer
Gale Force (2002) - director, producer
Wolfhound (2002) - director (some scenes, uncredited)
The Bare Wench Project 3: Nymphs of Mystery Mountain (2002) - director, writer, producer
Lost Treasure (2003) - director
Bare Wench Project: Uncensored (2003) - director
Bad Bizness (2003) - director
Treasure Hunt (2003) - director, writer
Project Viper (2002) - director
Cheerleader Massacre (2003) - director
The Thing Below (2004) - director, producer
Curse of the Komodo (2004) - director
Gargoyle: Wings of Darkness (2004) - director, writer, producer
Blue Demon (2004) - producer
Deep Evil (2004) - producer
Alabama Jones and the Busty Crusade (2005) - director
Lust Connection (2005) - director, writer, producer
Crash Landing (2005) - director, writer
Busty Cops (2005) - director, producer
Sub Zero (2005) - director
The Witches of Breastwick (2005) - director, writer, producer
The Witches of Breastwick 2 (2005) - director, producer
Komodo vs. Cobra (2005) - director, writer
Bare Wench: The Final Chapter (2005) - director, writer, producer
Busty Cops 2 (2006) - director
A.I. Assault (2006) - director, writer
The Da Vinci Coed (2007) - director, writer, producer
Cry of the Winged Serpent (2007) - director
The Breastford Wives (2007) - director, writer
House on Hooter Hill (2007) - director, writer
Bone Eater (2008) - director, writer
The Lusty Busty Babe-a-que (2008) - director
The Devil Wears Nada (2009) - director, writer
Cleavagefield (2009) - director, producer
Strip for Action (2009) - director (uncredited)
Vampire in Vegas (2009) - director
Fire from Below (2009) - director, writer, producer
Lost in the Woods (2009) - director, producer
Para-Knockers Activity (2009) - director
Dinocroc vs. Supergator (2010) - director, writer
Monster Cruise (2010) - director, writer
The Hills Have Thighs (2010) - director, writer (as Salvadore Ross)
Busty Cops and the Jewel of Denial (2010) - director, writer (Harold Blueberry)
Busty Cops Go Hawaiian (2010) - director, writer (Harold Blueberry)
Camel Spiders (2011) - director, writer, producer (as Jay Andrews)
Busty Coeds vs. Lusty Cheerleaders (2010) - director (as Sam Pepperman)
Piranhaconda (2012) - director
Gila! (2012) - director
Sexy Wives Sindrome (2013) - director, writer
Pleasure Spa (2013) - director
Hypnotika (2013) - director
Lucky Bastard (2014) - producer
Sexipede! (2014) - director (as Sam Pepperman), writer
Sexually Bugged! (2014) - director
Water Wars (2014) - director
Shark Babes (2015) - director
Sharkansas Women's Prison Massacre (2015) - director, writer
Scared Topless (2015) - director, writer
Nessie & Me (2016) - director, writer
A Doggone Christmas (2016) - director, writer
Legend of the Naked Ghost (2017) - director, writer
A Doggone Hollywood (2017) - director, writer
CobraGator (2018) - director

References

External links
 
 Interview with Jim Wynorski on (re)Search my Trash

1950 births
American male screenwriters
American parodists
Parody film directors
Living people
Writers from Glen Cove, New York
Horror film directors
Film directors from New York (state)
Screenwriters from New York (state)
People from Long Island